Heliconia mariae is a species of flowering plants in the family Heliconiaceae. It is found in North-West South America and Central America.

References

External links 

 Heliconia mariae observations at iNaturalist
 Heliconia mariae at The Plant List
 Heliconia mariae at Tropicos

mariae
Flora of Central America
Flora of South America
Plants described in 1863
Taxa named by Joseph Dalton Hooker